GABT may refer to:
 4-aminobutyrate transaminase, an enzyme
 GabT RNA motif